Political bias is a bias or perceived bias involving the slanting or altering of information to make a political position or political candidate seem more attractive. With a distinct association with media bias, it commonly refers to how a reporter, news organisation, or TV show covers a political candidate or a policy issue.

Bias emerges in a political context when individuals engage in an inability or an unwillingness to understand a politically opposing point of view. Such bias in individuals may have its roots in their traits and thinking styles; it is unclear whether individuals at particular positions along the political spectrum are more biased than any other individuals.

Political bias exists beyond simple presentation and understanding of view-points favouring a particular political leader or party but rather transcends into the readings and interactions among individuals undertaken on a daily basis.  The prevalence of political bias has a lasting impact with proven effects on voter behaviour and consequent political outcomes.

With an understanding of political bias, comes the acknowledgement of its violation of expected political neutrality. A lack of political neutrality is the result of political bias.

Types of bias in a political context

Concision bias: Refers to perspective reporting using only the words necessary to explain a view quickly and spends little or no time to detail unconventional, difficult to explain views. Concision bias aims to increase communication by selectively focusing on the important information and eliminating redundancy. In a political context this can mean the omission of seemingly unnecessary details can actually constitute bias in itself depending on what information is deemed unnecessary. Political opinions are often reduced to a simple party understanding or belief system, with other challenging information excluded in its presentation.

Coverage bias: When political parties address topics and issues to different extents. This makes certain issues seem more prevalent and presents ideas as more important or necessary. In a political atmosphere this applies to the presentation of policies and the issues they address, along with the actual coverage by media and politicians.

Confirmation bias: A cognitive bias that favours and seeks information which affirms pre-existing beliefs and opinions. When set in a political atmosphere, individuals with like-minded political beliefs will seek and affirm their opinions, discounting contradictory information. A recent meta-analysis attempted to compare levels of confirmation bias among liberals and conservatives in the United States and found that both groups were roughly equally biased.

False consensus bias: Exists when the normalisation of an individual's opinions, beliefs and values are believed to be common. This bias exists in a group setting where the collective group opinion is attributed to the wider population, with little to no inter group challenges. This is the basis of political party formation and engages in the ongoing attempt to normalise these views within the wider population with little recognition of different beliefs outside the party.

Speculative content: When stories focus on what has the potential to occur with speculative phrasing such as "may", "what if" and "could" rather than focusing on the evidence of what has and/or definitely will occur. When a piece is not specifically labelled as an opinion and analysis article, it can lead to further speculative bias. This occurs in a political context, particularly introducing policies, or addressing opposing policies. This bias allows parties to make their policies more appealing and appear to address issues more directly, by speculating the positive and negative outcomes.

Gatekeeping bias: This type of bias exists through the use of ideological selection, deselection and/or omission of stories based on individualised opinions. This is similarly related to agenda bias, existing primarily when the focus is on politicians and how they choose to cover and present preferred policy discussions and issues.

Partisan bias: Exists in the media when reporters serve and create the leaning of a particular political party.

Political neutrality
Political neutrality is the counteraction for political bias, looking to ensure the ability of public servants to carry out any official duties impartially, relative to their political beliefs. In areas like media coverage, legal and bureaucratic decisions and academic teachings, the need for taking corrective action against politically biased actions is the foundation of political neutrality enforcement. Research suggests that political neutrality is favoured over political bias, with Republicans, Independents and Democrats preferring to get their news from politically neutral media. Individuals responses to political bias and motivations are challenged when the engagement of bias furthers and assists their political party or ideology. The denunciation of political neutrality itself elicits a more aggravated response, directly controlling a normative acceptance of political bias. Limitations of  political neutrality exist regarding media coverage and generate accusations for any actions or messages perceived as politically biased. Biases remain embedded in contextual intergroup competition, meaning political considerations based on action or message can challenge specific ideologies or further enhance and advance an ideology.

Political bias and framing
Political bias exists primarily in the concept of framing. Framing is the social construction of political or social movements with a positive or negative representation. Political bias in this context is political leaders and parties presenting information to highlight a problem and offering solutions that favour their own political position. This makes their personal position appear more favourable and their policies as the expected course of action. The framing effect looks at the situations in which people are only presented with options within two frames, one presented negatively and the other positively. The framing effect is increasingly significant in opinion polls designed to encourage specific organisations that are commissioned to poll. If reliable, credible and sufficient information is provided, this bias can be significantly reduced. Framing further looks at the impact of slanting in political campaigning and its potential impact on the distribution of political power where political bias is present. It is important to understand framing is an omnipresent process used in analysis to discern connections between aspects of reality and to convey an interpretation of opinions that may not be entirely accurate.

Evidence of political bias in search engines
Search results from search engines like Google often shape opinions and perceptions of political issues and candidates. Google does not design algorithms to provide balanced or equal representation of controversial issues. Search engines influence democracy because of the potential distrust of media leading to increasing online searches for political information and understanding. Looking specifically at America, the Fairness Doctrine was introduced in 1949 to avoid political bias in all licensed broadcasting media. Within the context of polarising topics such as political bias, the top search results can play a significant role in shaping opinions. Through the use of a bias quantification framework, bias can be measured within the political bias by rank within the search system. It can further address the sources of the bias through the input data and ranking system. Within the context of information queries, a ranking system determines the search results, which in the case of topics such as politics can return politically biased search results. The bias presented in the search results can directly result from either biased data that collaborates the ranking system or because of the structure of the ranking system itself. This questionable nature of search results raises questions of the impact on users and to what degree the ranking system can impact political opinions and beliefs, which can directly translate into voter behaviour. This can also affirm or encourage biased data within the Google search results. Whilst research has shown users do not place exclusive trust on the information provided by search engines, studies have shown that individuals who are undecided politically are susceptible to manipulation by bias relative to political candidates and the light in which their policies and actions are presented and conveyed. In the quantification of political bias, both the input data for search results and the ranking system in which they are presented to the user encapsulates bias to varying degrees.

There is distinctive political bias present in social media where the algorithm which structures user content facilitates confirmation bias. This involves presenting political information dependent on common searches and focuses of the users further re-affirming political bias and reducing exposure to politically neutral content.

Determining the difference between content and source bias is a significant focus of determining the role of political bias in search engines. This focus looks directly at the actual content of the information present and whether it is purposefully selective in the information presented, or rather whether the source of the information is projecting personalised opinions relative to their political opinions.

Political bias in the media
Media bias highlights political bias in the reporting of political topics and the representation of politicians. Where a reporter sometimes emphasises particular points of view and conveys selected information to further their own political view, they may present biased information favouring their own political opinion or that of their readership. Determining media biases relative to political positioning, there are distinctive regulations which protect against the fabrication of information. The media, rather, may alter the representation of information to promote political positions. Media bias can alter political opinions, which directly impact voter behaviour and decisions, because of the failed representation of information. This form of political bias has continuing impacts when used to change opinions of others. Where media remains a powerful information source for political information, it can create political bias in the informational representation of political actors and policy issues

An example of quantification of political bias in the media is a propaganda model, a concept introduced by Edward S. Herman and Noam Chomsky. It is a political economy model, looking at the "manufacturing" of political policies through manipulation of mass media. This model further looked at the capital funding of media outlets and their ownership, which often relates to political ties.

Political bias in the media is also discussed showing how social leaders discuss political issues. To determine the existence of political bias, agenda determination is used. Agenda determination is designed to provide an understanding of the agenda behind the presentation of political issues and attempt to determine the political bias that is present.

Within a 2002 study by Jim A. Kuypers: Press Bias and Politics: How the Media Frame Controversial Issues, he looks at the omission of left leaning points of view from the mainstream print press. Kuypers determined  politicians would receive positive press coverage only when covering and delivering topics that aligned with press-supported beliefs. This meant the press were engaging in bias within the media through their coverage and selection/release of political information, which was challenging the neutral conveyance of political messages.

David Baron similarly presents a game-theoretic model of media behaviour, suggesting that mass media outlets only hire journalists whose writing is aligned with their political positions. This engages false consensus bias, as beliefs are determined to be common because of being surrounding by aligned views. This effectively heightens the political bias within media representation of information.

See also 

 Fake news
 False equivalence
 Framing (social sciences)
 Freedom of speech by country
 Mainstream media
 
 Mass media impact on spatial perception
 
 Political correctness
 Schismogenesis
 Self-censorship

References

Further reading 

 Game Theory: An Introduction, Baron, David 
 The New Media's Role in Politics, Owen, Diana

External links 

 Search bias quantification: investigating political bias in social media and web search: Information Retrieval Journal<noinclude>
When do we care about political neutrality? The hypocritical nature of reaction to political bias: Plos Research Article

 
Communication of falsehoods
Barriers to critical thinking
Prejudices
Politics
Media bias
Cognitive biases